Tight junction-associated protein 1 is a protein that in humans is encoded by the TJAP1 gene.

Interactions
TJAP1 has been shown to interact with DLG1.

References

Further reading